Kyler Mackenzie Pettis (born October 16, 1992) is an American actor. In 2015, he was cast in the SORASed Theo Carver on the NBC soap opera, Days of Our Lives, a role he remained in until 2018. In 2019, he won the Daytime Emmy Award for Outstanding Younger Actor in a Drama Series.

Early life
Pettis was born in Laguna Hills, California to ex National Football League cheerleader Peggy and former Major League Baseball player Gary Pettis. He has 3 siblings Paige, Shaye and Dante. Dante plays professional football for the Chicago Bears. Kyler studied at JSerra Catholic High School in 2011, and graduated from Saddleback College in 2013.

Career
Pettis was signed with Otto Models. In August 2015, Pettis took over the role from Terrell Ransom, Jr as the autistic son of Abe and Lexie Carver on Days of Our Lives. He debuted as Theo Carver on November 3, 2015. The casting call described the character as a "16-year-old, gorgeous, African American male" who is a High-functioning autistic (HFA). In August 2016, Pettis booked a role in the movie "M.F.A." as a character named Conor. The film is directed by Natalia Leite and written by Leah McKendrick.

Filmography

Awards and nominations

References

External links
 
 

American male film actors
American male television actors
1992 births
American male soap opera actors
Daytime Emmy Award winners
Daytime Emmy Award for Outstanding Younger Actor in a Drama Series winners
Living people
Male actors from California